Green Star Media Ltd is a United Kingdom-based international publisher of specialist sports content through websites, e-magazines and e-books. The company has a subscription-based business model where advertising is not a significant source of revenue. It publishes informed and easy-to-follow advice for coaches in football (soccer), rugby, basketball, for athletes in endurance sports, and sports physiotherapists (physical therapists).

The company was founded by Andrew Griffiths, a former business journalist with The Daily Telegraph and founder of the award-winning AIM Newsletter, which covered London's Alternative Investment Market for smaller companies. Griffiths left the company in November 2018 and remains a significant shareholder.

Trevor Goul-Wheeker was chairman of Green Star Media from January 2013 until May 2015.

Chrysalis VCT invested in the business in June 2014 by providing investment loans. At the same time the company bought two titles, Peak Performance and Sports Injury Bulletin, from Electric Word.

In 2014, the company was shortlisted for a Media Pioneer Award for launching Basketball Coach Weekly into the US market.

Titles 

 Rugby Coach Weekly
 Soccer Coach Weekly
 Elite Soccer
 Basketball Coach Weekly
 Peak Performance
 Sports Injury Bulletin
 Women's Soccer Coaching

References

External links

Publishing companies of the United Kingdom
Magazine publishing companies of the United Kingdom
Online publishing companies